Kuban's nase or Kuban nase (Chondrostoma kubanicum) is a species of freshwater fish in the family Cyprinidae.

It is found in the Kuban River drainage in the North Caucasus region in Russia.

References 

 
 

Chondrostoma
Fish of Russia
Cyprinid fish of Europe
Taxa named by Lev Berg
Fish described in 1914